CKXY-FM (91.5 FM, 91.5 Cochrane Now) is a radio station licensed to Cochrane, Alberta. Owned by Golden West Broadcasting, it broadcasts a country format.

History
In February 2007, Tiessen Media received CRTC approval to add a rebroadcaster of CFIT-FM/Airdrie at 95.3 FM in Cochrane, Alberta. In March 2009, the CRTC approved an application by Tiessen to move CFIT-FM-1's transmitter to a new location with a higher elevation, and change its frequency to 91.5. Tiessen cited that this would improve reception (especially among those commuting from Calgary), and allow it to be fed over-the-air by CFIT's main signal.

On July 9, 2015, the station's current owner Golden West Broadcasting submitted an application with the CRTC for a new radio station serving Cochrane, which would replace CFIT-FM-1 on its frequency. Golden West proposed a country format with a focus on local news and information. The application was denied by the CRTC, ruling that the proposed station would likely have to solicit advertising sales outside of Cochrane in order to be economically viable, and that the station could dilute the revenue and audience of Calgary-based stations.

On December 3, 2018, the CRTC approved a revised application for the station, citing improving economic conditions and population growth in Calgary and Cochrane that are sufficient to support a new radio station, a signal with a shorter primary contour than before (only covering Cochrane and its immediate area, thus creating a new radio market), and Golden West agreeing to a condition of license forbidding the station from soliciting advertising in the city of Calgary.

On October 24, 2019, the new station officially launched as 91.5 Cochrane Now, with the call letters CKXY-FM.

Call letter history
The CKXY callsign was used at a number of unrelated defunct radio stations such as AM 1040 Vancouver, British Columbia in the late 1980's and 92.3 FM in Fort Smith, Northwest Territories, a repeater of CIRK-FM Edmonton, until it left the air in 2018.

References

External links
 
CKXY-FM History – Canadian Communications Foundation
 

Kxy
Fit
Radio stations established in 2019
2019 establishments in Alberta